Pultenaea platyphylla, commonly known as flat-leaf bush-pea, is a species of flowering plant in the family Fabaceae and is endemic to south-eastern continental Australia. It is an erect, rigidly-branched shrub with narrow egg-shaped to wedge-shaped leaves with the narrower end towards the base, and yellow to orange and red to purple flowers.

Description

Taxonomy
Pultenaea platyphylla was first formally described in 1957 by Norman Arthur Wakefield in The Victorian Naturalist from specimens collected at Mt. Tarrengower near Maldon in 1921. The specific epithet (platyphylla) means "flat-leaved".

Distribution and habitat
Flat-leaf bush-pea grows in forest on granite hills in scattered locations in north-eastern Victoria and south of Temora in New South Wales.

References

Fabales of Australia
Flora of New South Wales
Flora of Victoria (Australia)
platyphylla
Plants described in 1957